Cleveland City Schools is a school system based in Cleveland, Tennessee. The system operates ten schools and enrolls over 5,500 students.

Schools

High schools 
Cleveland High School - primary high school
Denning Center for Technology and Careers (formerly Teen Learning Center) - alternative high school

Middle school 
Cleveland Middle School

Elementary schools 
Arnold Memorial Elementary School
Ernest L. Ross Elementary School
Donald P. Yates Primary School
Blythe Bower Elementary School
Mayfield Elementary School
George R. Stuart Elementary School
Candy's Creek Cherokee Elementary School

History
The district was founded in 1885 by D.C. Arnold, who was hailed as the "father of the graded school system of Cleveland." Cleveland High School opened its doors in September 1966. The Teen Learning Center was founded as an alternative high school in 1994. It was renamed the F.I. Denning Center of Technology and Careers in 2015 in honor of Dr. Frederick I. "Rick" Denning, who was the director of schools when it was founded.

See also 
Cleveland, Tennessee#Education
Bradley County Schools

References 

 
Education in Bradley County, Tennessee
School districts in Tennessee
School districts established in 1885